Swordsman is a 2013 Chinese television series adapted from Louis Cha's novel The Smiling, Proud Wanderer. The series is written and produced by Yu Zheng, and stars Wallace Huo, Joe Chen, Yuan Shanshan, Chen Xiao and Yang Rong. Shooting started on 24 March 2015 in Xiandu, Jinyun County, Lishui, Zhejiang. It was first aired in China on Hunan Television from 6 February to 4 March 2013. The plot deviates significantly from the novel, with Dongfang Bubai depicted as a woman (instead of a castrated man) and having a romantic affair with Linghu Chong.

Plot

Cast

 Wallace Huo as Linghu Chong / Yang Lianting
 Joe Chen as Dongfang Bubai
 Yuan Shanshan as Ren Yingying / Xuexin
 Jiang Yiyi as young Ren Yingying
 Chen Xiao as Lin Pingzhi / Duyuan (Lin Yuantu)
 Yang Rong as Yue Lingshan
 Howie Huang as Yue Buqun
 Wu Junyu as young Yue Buqun
 Yang Mingna as Ning Zhongze
 Heizi as Ren Woxing
 Deng Sha as Yilin
 Bryan Leung as Feng Qingyang
 Zhang Zhuowen as Lu Dayou
 Cheng Cheng as Lao Denuo
 Bao Wenjing as Yiyu
 Han Dong as Tian Boguang
 Sun Binhao as Xiang Wentian
 Lü Jiarong as Lan Fenghuang
 Xie Ning as Laotouzi
 Shen Baoping as Zu Qianqiu
 Zhang Tianyang as Ji Wushi
 Ye Qishan as Sima Da
 Marco Li as Yu Canghai
 Zhang Hengping as Fangzheng
 He Jiayi as Dingyi
 Hu Dong as Zuo Lengshan
 Li Ruichao as Yu Renhao
 Wang Renjun as Ping Yizhi
 Zhang Tianqi as Jia Renda
 Guo Dongdong as Gu Tong
 Wang Shuang as Bai Ying
 Zhang Jixuan as Heixiong
 Guan Xin as Baixiong
 Bai Hailong as Fangsheng
 Wei Ziqian as Shangguan Yun
 Wang Zheng as Lu Bai
 Shao Min as Dingjing
 Zhang Chunzhong as Mu Gaofeng
 He Xin as Luo Renjie
 Zhang Haoxiang as Mo Da
 Chang Sheng as Tianmen
 Zhou Shaodong as Wang Yuanba
 Zhao Junlong as Wang Bofen
 Guo Wei as Ding Mian
 Mo Meilin as Tong Baixiong
 Wang Kai as Feng Buping
 Liao Xi as Cheng Buyou
 Zhu Rongrong as Mi Weiyi
 Cao Nan as Fei Bin
 Gu Dechao as Adviser Yi
 Yin Jian as Ding Jian
 Zhang Keyan as Jia Bu
 Xiaoshuai as Liu Jin
 Tong Tong as Mute Granny
 Wang Zelin as Heibao
 Chai Ge as Zheng
 Zhang Lei as Shi
 Yang Yaotian as Yuqingzi
 Guo Qiang as Yujizi
 Wei Qianxiang as Sun Jiantong
 Miao Luoyi as Princess Consort
 Zhang Xueying as Lao Busi
 Liu Shuo as Qinghai Yixiao
 Pan Haichen as Hongye
 Gong Sile as Yue Su
 Shi Tianshuo as Cai Zifeng
 Zhuo Fan as Yilin's father
 Li Li as Yilin's mother
 Ju Lai as Lodge Master Qi
 Feng Jujing as Lodge Master Yi
 Kang Jie as Swordsman
 Wang Gang as Yue Buqun's master
 Yin Baoying as Beauty

Special appearances
 Dicky Cheung as Lüzhuweng
 Zhang Qian as Huahua
 Qian Yongchen as Yu Renyan
 Hai Lu as Yuniang
 Huang Haibing as Dugu Qiubai
 Zhou Muyin as Liu Zhengfeng's wife
 Ren Quan as Danqingsheng
 Bao Bei'er as Tubiweng
 Wang Jianxin as Huang Zhonggong
 Zhao Liang as Heibaizi
 Kou Zhenhai as Lin Zhennan
 Bai Shan as Lin Zhennan's wife
 Huo Zhengyan as Liu Zhengfeng
 Zong Fengyan as Qu Yang

Renaming of Shaolin Monastery to Lingjiu Monastery
In the series, Shaolin Monastery (or Shaolin School) is renamed Lingjiu Monastery (靈鷲寺; "Divine Eagle Monastery"). The change is believed to be because the producers wanted to avoid trademark infringement, since Shaolin Monastery has officially registered "Shaolin" as a trademark and has been involved in lawsuits with commercial companies over the use of "Shaolin" as a brand name or trademark.

Soundtrack

Reception
Prior to its original broadcast, Swordsman received popular attention for its teen idol cast in comparison with older adaptations of The Smiling, Proud Wanderer, and for major amendments made to the original story. Particular attention was shed on Joe Chen's casting as Dongfang Bubai, a minor antagonist in the novel whose role was substantially rewritten in this series to portray him/her as one of two female protagonists alongside Yuan Shanshan's character, Ren Yingying.

During and following its broadcast, the series received mixed and largely polarised reviews. The series was both praised and criticised for its unfaithfulness to the novel, although producer Yu Zheng asserted that it is one of the 'most faithful' adaptations of The Smiling, Proud Wanderer. Nevertheless, the series maintained high ratings throughout its run. The new characterisation of Dongfang Bubai sparked controversy, even though Joe Chen's performance as a complex character was praised, and Dongfang Bubai became a feminist pop icon. Chen Xiao's portrayal of Lin Pingzhi was also critically acclaimed, but Yuan Shanshan's Ren Yingying was critically dismissed as a miscast of the original character in the novel. Attention was directed towards the prominence of romantic plotlines and subplots in the series which were similarly met with mixed reviews. However, new romantic pairings among the cast as follows were well received by younger audiences: Wallace Huo's Linghu Chong and Joe Chen's Dongfang Bubai; Han Dong's Tian Boguang and Deng Sha's Yilin; Chen Xiao's Lin Pingzhi and Yang Rong's Yue Lingshan; Lü Jiarong's Lan Fenghuang and Han Dong's Tian Boguang.

Awards and nominations

References

External links
 
  Swordsman on Cathay Media's website

Chinese wuxia television series
Chinese romance television series
Works based on The Smiling, Proud Wanderer
2013 Chinese television series debuts
Television series about orphans
Television series set in Imperial China
Television shows written by Yu Zheng
Hunan Television dramas
Television shows based on works by Jin Yong
Television series by Huanyu Film